The Kurdistan Justice Group ( Komelî Dadgerî Kurdistan), formerly Kurdistan Islamic Group, is a movement in Iraqi Kurdistan established in May 2001 by Ali Bapir, a former leader of the Islamic Movement of Kurdistan.

Policy
Regarding their position in relation to other political parties, in a January 2003 interview Ali Bapir stated: "Our policy is that we enter into fraternity and cooperation with all Islamic groups. We seek such fraternal relations with Islamic parties and organizations, Islamist figures, and groups that follow a Salafi tradition or a Sufi or a scientific tradition. In the Komala Islami, we believe that the group must be open-minded and seek fraternity with all those who call or act for Islam. If we see a mistake, we will try to correct it through dialogue and by creating a fraternal atmosphere."

Kurdistan Justice Group and Kurdistan Islamic Movement were among the first to congratulate the Taliban when they took control of Afghanistan. MPs of the group said that they are "sending them congratulations and prayers".

In terms of its relationship with other Kurdish political groups, the KIG has generally maintained a cooperative approach, but has also been involved in some political disputes and rivalries. The party has often emphasized the importance of unity among the Kurdish people, and has advocated for dialogue and peaceful resolution of conflicts.

Anti-LGBT rhetoric 
On February 22, 2021, it was announced that a lawsuit was filed against Rasan by an MP of an Islamist political fraction called Kurdistan Justice Group, Omer Gulpi, because the organization advocated for LGBT+ rights locally, and according to him, this was a "against the values of the Kurdish culture."

Kurdistan Justice Group is linked to an anti-LGBT+ and conservative organization called Astane. The organization works on publishing anti-LGBT, SRHR, and gender propaganda.

References

Islamic organizations
Islamic political parties in Iraq
Kurdish Islamic organisations
Kurdish Islamism
Kurdish nationalism in Iraq
Kurdish nationalist political parties
Kurdish political parties in Iraq
Political parties in Kurdistan Region
Rebel groups in Iraq